Abba is a form of ab, meaning "father" in many Semitic languages. It is used as a given name, but was also used as a title or honorific for religious scholars or leaders. (The word abbot has the same root.)

Persons with the given name Abba, or who are known by that title

Jewish/Babylonian/Palestinian religious scholars
Abba of Acre (3rd century), Jewish religious scholar
Abba Arika (175-247), Jewish/Babylonian religious scholar
Abba bar Abba (2nd-3rd century), Jewish/Babylonian religious scholar
Abba bar Zabdai (3rd century), Jewish/Palestinian religious scholar
Abba ben Joseph bar Ḥama (270-350), Jewish/Babylonian religious scholar known in the Talmud as Rava
Abba Mordechai Berman (1919-2005), Polish Jewish rabbi and religious scholar
Abba Hilkiah (1st century), Jewish Hasidic sage
Abba Jose ben Hanan (1st century), Jewish sage and tanna
Abba Mari (13th-14th century), French/Jewish rabbi
Abba Mari ben Simson Anatoli (c. 1194-1256), a French/Jewish scholar and translator of Arabic texts
Raba (Rabbah) Bar Jeremiah (Also called "Abba"), a Jewish Talmudist

Horse names of Jimma rulers
Abba Bok'a (died 1862), a ruler of the Kingdom of Jimma in what is today southwestern Ethiopia
Abba Gomol, ruler of the Kingdom of Jimma 1862-78; son of Abba Bok'a
Abba Jifar I (ruled 1830 - c. 1855) and Abba Jifar II (ruled 1878-1932), kings of the Kingdom of Jimma
Abba Jofir, Ethiopian aristocrat briefly (1932) king of the Kingdom of Jimma
Abba Magal (c. 1800), Oromo leader, father of Abba Jifar I, founder of the Kingdom of Jimma

Others
Abba (count), a Frisian count
Abba Thulle, ibedul of Koror
Abba Ahimeir (1897-1962), Russian Jewish journalist, historian, and Zionist
Abba Eban (1915–2002), Israeli diplomat and politician, and President of the Weizmann Institute of Science
Abba Gerasimus (5th century), Lycian Christian monk and abbot revered as a saint
Abba Gindin (b. 1946), Finnish/Israeli ice hockey player
Abba Habib, Nigerian politician
Abbot "Abbie" Hoffman, whose Hebrew name was Abba
Abba Hushi (1898-1969), Israeli politician
Abba Kovner (1918-1987), Lithuanian Jewish/Israeli poet, writer, and partisan leader
Abba Kyari (1938-2020), Nigerian military officer, governor, and business leader
Abba P. Lerner (1903–1982), American economist
Abba Musa Rimi (b. 1940), Nigerian politician, governor of Kaduna State
Abba Hillel Silver (1893–1963), U.S. Rabbi and Zionist leader
Abba Goold Woolson (1838-1921), American writer
Abba Wada, Nigerian business tycoon, and hero

See also
Avva

Feminine given names
Jewish masculine given names
Nigerian names